Waltraud Roick (born 23 February 1948) is a German rower. She competed in the women's eight event at the 1976 Summer Olympics.

References

1948 births
Living people
German female rowers
Olympic rowers of West Germany
Rowers at the 1976 Summer Olympics
Sportspeople from Lübeck